Vanessa Neumann (born 1972, Caracas) is a Venezuelan-American diplomat, business owner, author and political theorist. Neumann is the president and founder of Asymmetrica, a political risk research and strategic communications  firm headquartered in New York City and Washington, D.C. Neumann served for four years on the OECD's Task Force on Countering Illicit Trade, and has been a consultant to UN Women on gender-based approaches to preventing and countering violent extremism. She is the author of the 2017 book Blood Profits: How American Consumers Unwittingly Fund Terrorists, as well as its 2018 Brazilian edition, Lucros de Sangue.

During the 2019 Venezuelan presidential crisis, a plenary session of the Venezuelan National Assembly approved her appointment as ambassador for the acting President Juan Guaidó. She was appointed Ambassador and Chief of Mission for Venezuela to the Court of St. James's in the United Kingdom. The administration of Nicolás Maduro does not recognize Guaido's diplomats. In 2020, Neumann was a central figure in the historic (London) High Court decision that "unequivocally" recognized the legitimacy of the presidency of Juan Guaidó over that of Nicolás Maduro. The ruling against Maduro and in favor of Guaidó was upheld by the UK Supreme Court on 20 December 2021.

Early life

Vanessa Antonia Neumann was born in Caracas, Venezuela to Michal (the Czech version of what would be Miguel in Spanish, Michael in English, or Mikhail in Russian) Neumann (1947-1992) and Antonia Donnelly (1947-2015). Miguel Neumann was the son of entrepreneurs Hans and Milada Neumann, Jews who emigrated from Czechoslovakia to Venezuela in 1949. Antonia Donnelly de Neumann was an American of Irish and Italian descent. Neumann's grandfather, Hans Neumann, co-founded Corimon (Corporación Industrial Montana), which had its IPO on the New York Stock Exchange on March 23, 1993, and Fundación Neumann, a philanthropic foundation with the twin missions of cultural education and poverty alleviation programs. For a quarter century, Hans Neumann was also the major shareholder of the Mustique Company, which owns the island of Mustique. He also owned two newspapers in Venezuela: the English-language The Daily Journal, and Tal Cual. Mila Neumann was given the Order of Francisco de Miranda. Miguel Neumann founded Intercomunica, which produced a television series interviewing political leaders on the world stage and a series of books on Venezuelan cinema and culture. Miguel Neumann also owned the Spanish winery Vega Sicilia.

Education 
Neumann received her B.A. (1994), M.A. (1998), M.Phil. (2000), and Ph.D. (2004) from Columbia University, where she submitted her doctoral dissertation, "Autonomy and Legitimacy of States: A Critical Approach to Foreign Intervention," under the tutelage of Rawlsian scholar Thomas Pogge.

Professional career 
In the 1990s, Neumann worked as a journalist in Caracas for English-language newspaper The Daily Journal, and then in corporate planning and finance at Venezuelan petrochemicals conglomerate Corimon, the time of its ADR listing on the NYSE.

While pursuing her doctorate, she volunteered for UNICEF for four years, starting in 2001, raising funds from individual and corporate donors and traveling to Tanzania to coordinate with the local health administration on tetanus vaccinations. At the Centre for Applied Philosophy and Public Ethics (CAPPE) in Canberra, Australia, in 2006, she supported Thomas Pogge's research into reform of the global institutional order for the alleviation of extreme poverty. While working as adjunct assistant professor of philosophy at Hunter College of The City University of New York, she was also an analyst at the International Institute for Strategic Studies in London, where she conducted research into Latin American security, particularly the role of Venezuela in providing haven and funding for the Colombian FARC guerrilla movement. She became editor-at-large for Diplomat, a UK magazine on diplomacy in the UK and EU. In 2009 - 2010, Neumann worked in the field in Colombia on the reintegration of paramilitaries. In 2013, the year Vanessa Neumann, Inc. became Asymmetrica, Neumann was the academic reviewer for the United States Special Operations Command (SOCOM) teaching text on counterinsurgency in Colombia.

Neumann's academic talks are centered on three areas of research: Venezuela, crime-terror pipelines, and foreign investment (particularly from China) in the Latin American energy sector. She is also a cited expert on illicit financial flows from Chinese counterfeiting.

Neumann is a commentator on politics and a vocal critic of the Hugo Chávez and Nicolás Maduro regimes, and she cites organized crime conducted by them as a cause of oppression in her native Venezuela. Her book Blood Profits: How American Consumers Unwittingly Fund Terrorists has drawn support from exiled Venezuelan opposition leaders and she cites organized crime by the Maduro regime as a cause of the economic collapse and human rights violations in her native Venezuela.

Neumann has published articles in The Wall Street Journal, The Daily Beast, The (London) Sunday Times, The Guardian, The Daily Telegraph, The Weekly Standard, Standpoint and many other publications. She appears regularly on CNN, CNNE, Fox Business, Al Jazeera, NTN24, GloboTV, and other networks. She is a regular guest on Varney & Co. She was once introduced as a panelist by a Department of State official. Her written work has been used by the American Enterprise Institute. Neumann's research on Venezuela and crime-terror pipelines has been cited in Matthew Levitt's book Hezbollah: The Global Footprint of Lebanon's Party of God (Washington, DC: Georgetown UP, 2013) and Louise Shelley's Dirty Entanglements: Corruption, Crime and Terrorism (New York: Cambridge UP, 2014), among other works.

In New York in 2010 Neumann founded her business, named Asymmetrica. It is part of the research network for the UN Security Council's Counter-Terrorism Executive Directorate.

On 13 March 2019, Dr. Neumann testified before the House Foreign Affairs Committee of the United States Congress, as part of Hearing on H.R. 1004: Prohibiting Unauthorized Military Action in Venezuela Act.

Ambassador to the UK 
During the 2019 Venezuelan presidential crisis, a plenary session of Venezuela's National Assembly endorsed acting president Juan Guaidó's appointment of Neumann as his Ambassador and Chief of Mission to the Court of St. James (the UK).

Neumann was a central figure in a landmark trial on who controls Venezuela's national gold reserves held at the Bank of England (Nicolás Maduro or Juan Guaidó) that took place in London's High Court, 22–25 June 2020. On the day the trial started, Neumann stated clearly the purpose of the trial: “The gold in the vaults in the Bank of England is our national reserves. It belongs to our people, to secure our nation’s future.” On 2 July 2020, Justice Nigel Teare issued his decision: Her Majesty's Government of the United Kingdom "unequivocally" recognizes Juan Guaidó as the president of Venezuela. In The Wall Street Journal, Juan Guaidó stated: “This is a grand victory for us in the area of international law," and Neumann stated: "It’s a national reserve, it’s safeguarded for the future, for the reconstruction of the country in the democratic system.” To the Financial Times, Neumann declared: "The verdict is a victory for the people of Venezuela and for the rule of law more generally. It highlights the importance of a judiciary that is independent and non-political." On 5 July 2020, Her Majesty Queen Elizabeth II sent a letter to Juan Guaidó congratulating the Venezuelan people on their Independence Day celebrations.

Return to the Private Sector 
In November 2020, Neumann's LinkedIn profile was changed to reflect her return to the helm of Asymmetrica. Her resignation as Guaidó's ambassador to the UK appeared on page 2 of the December 1, 2020 edition of The Financial Times.

ON 4 February 2022, Neumann was appointed to the board of Tintra, a UK bank and fast growing regtech firm listed on the AIM market of the London Stock Exchange. In a 10 March 2022 interview with Finance Monthly, she discussed how biases and prejudices within the Western Financial System pose challenges for emerging markets and why she thinks advanced technology and AI, like Tintra is developing, is key to creating efficiencies and promote development.

Current affiliations

 Global Counter-Terrorism Research Network (GCTRN), United Nations Security Council, New York, NY. Since 2015.
 Fellow, Global Justice Program, Yale University; New Haven, CT. Since 2014.
 Associate, University Seminar on Latin America, Columbia University; New York, NY. Since 2010.

Personal life 
Neumann dated Mick Jagger in 1998. Their relationship ended in 2002. She was later engaged to Scottish landowner William Stirling. Neumann married William Cash, son of Sir William Cash, a British Conservative politician and Member of Parliament for Stone. They divorced in 2010.

Vanessa Neumann is a passionate horseback rider and a certified open water, advanced deep water diver. In January 2014 she attained her PADI certification as an enriched air diver, known as nitrox diving.

Books
 Neumann, Vanessa Antonia (2004). Autonomy and Legitimacy of States: A Critical Approach to Foreign Intervention. Dissertation, Columbia University. 
 
 Neumann, Vanessa (2018). Lucros de sangue: Como o consumidor financia o terrorismo. Matrix Editora.  ISBN 978-8-582-30500-3

References

External links
 Vanessa Neumann Official Website

Venezuelan emigrants to the United States
Venezuelan women journalists
Living people
1972 births
Venezuelan people of Czech descent
American women journalists
Writers from Caracas
Columbia Graduate School of Arts and Sciences alumni
21st-century American women